Paula Ritchie is a Scottish woman cricketer. She made her international debut for Scotland during the 2008 Women's Cricket World Cup Qualifier after replacing Caroline Heron who was initially named in the squad due to injury. She plays club cricket for Ferguslie Club in Scotland.

References

External links 

Living people
Scottish women cricketers
Date of birth missing (living people)
Year of birth missing (living people)